{{original Malyar or Maliar is a profession. (English: Malyar) which means gardening in Urdu.  In the northern region of Afghanistan and Pakistan, Potohar, Hazara Division and Kashmir and Khyber Pakhtunkhwa and the surrounding language, the gardener is called Malyar or Maliar, a landowner Rajput tribes,Khokhar Rajput,Janjua Rajput,Bhatti Rajput, & Jutt tribes, Jatal Jutt, Malahi Jutt, &  Kumbuh tribes & Awan tribes & Arain tribes & Pakhtun tribes and afghan tribes have adopted it.  In this profession, crops and vegetables are cultivated on the land, this profession has been adopted by the tribes of the following nations.Rajput tribes,Khokhar Rajput,Janjua Rajput,Bhatti Rajput, & Jutt tribes, Jatal Jutt, Malahi Jutt, &  Kumbuh tribes & Awan tribes & Arain tribes & Pakhtun tribes and afghan tribes.

See also
Jamal Malyar

References 

Social groups of Pakistan
Punjabi tribes
Hindkowan tribes
Social groups of Jammu and Kashmir
Social groups of Punjab, Pakistan
Social groups of Khyber Pakhtunkhwa